René V. Dawis is an American psychology professor.
He taught at University of Minnesota and is currently an emeritus professor. His work focused on individual differences, work adjustment, and human potential. He received the American Psychological Associations's Leona Tyler Award in 1999.

Dawis received his MA in 1955 and his PhD in 1956.

At the University of Minnesota he was director of the Counseling Psychology Program from 1975 to 1985. Since 1997, he has been emeritus psychology at the same university.

In 1995, he was a signatory of a collective statement in response to The Bell Curve titled "Mainstream Science on Intelligence", written by Intelligence editor Linda Gottfredson and published in the Wall Street Journal.

He was a principal investigator into several projects at the Industrial Relations Center at the Carlson School of Management.

Publications
Dawis RV (1989). Psychology: Human relations and work adjustment. Gregg Division, McGraw-Hill; 7th ed edition  .
Lubinski D, et al. (1995). Assessing Individual Differences in Human Behavior: New Concepts, Methods, and Findings. Davies-Black Publishing; 1st edition. .
Dawis RV (1984). A psychological theory of work adjustment: An individual-differences model and its applications. University of Minnesota Press. .
Dawis RV et al. (1988). Psychology: Behavior, Motivation, and Work Adjustment. Paradigm Publishing 7th edition. .
Fruehling RT, Dawis RV (1995). Psychology: Realizing Human Potential. Paradigm Publishing. .
Lofquist LH, Dawis RV (1991). Essentials of Person-Environment-Correspondence Counseling. University of Minnesota Press. .

References

21st-century American psychologists
1928 births
Living people
University of Minnesota faculty
20th-century American psychologists